Thomas Glover may refer to:

Thomas Blake Glover (1838–1911), Scottish merchant in Bakumatsu and Meiji, Japan
Sir Thomas Glover (diplomat), English Ambassador to the Ottoman Empire, 1606–1611
Thomas Glover (politician) (1852–1913), British Member of Parliament for St Helens, 1906–1910
Tom Glover (baseball) (1912–1948), Negro league baseball player
Tom Glover (soccer) (born 1997), Australian soccer player
 Tom Glover (cartoonist) (1891–1938), cartoonist working in New Zealand and Australia